The Porsche Design Tower is a luxury residential skyscraper in Sunny Isles Beach, Florida, designed by Sieger Suarez Architects and branded by Porsche Design.  At  with 60 stories, it is one of the tallest buildings in Sunny Isles Beach. It is unique for its inclusion of a robotic parking garage, having 284 parking spaces for 132 units allowing unit owners to park two or four cars right outside their unit. The tower also extensively features premium glasswork by prominent international glass firm Continental Glass Systems. 

Each unit ranges in cost from $4 million to $32.5 million. Drivers ride up the elevator in their cars and are placed into their own "garage" adjacent to their unit. The tower has three elevators to take cars to their units and estimated to cost about $560 million to build.

The groundbreaking commenced on April 19, 2014 at the Sales Center of the Porsche Design Tower in Sunny Isles Beach, Florida. The building was completed in January 2017.

See also
List of tallest buildings in Sunny Isles Beach
Porsche Design
Dezer Properties
Sam Moussa
Porsche Design Tower (Stuttgart)

References

External links
 

Porsche Tower Miami

2017 establishments in Florida
Buildings and structures in Miami-Dade County, Florida
Residential buildings completed in 2017
Skyscrapers in Florida